Chiel is a Dutch given name. Notable people with the name include:

 Chiel Meijering (born 1954), Dutch composer
 Chiel Warners (born 1978), Dutch decathlete
 Chiel Kramer (born 1992), Dutch footballer

Dutch given names